Mathew Wollmann is an American politician who served in the South Dakota House of Representatives from the 8th district from 2015 to 2017.

He resigned on January 23, 2017, after admitting to having sex with two House interns.

References

Living people
Republican Party members of the South Dakota House of Representatives
Year of birth missing (living people)